The Vancouver 25 is a Canadian trailerable sailboat that was designed by Robert B. Harris as a blue water cruiser and first built in 1983.

Production
The design was built in Taiwan under contract to the Vancouver 25 Yacht Company of Canada, starting in 1983. A total of 28 boats were completed, but it is now out of production.

Design
The Vancouver 25 is a recreational keelboat, built predominantly of fibreglass, with wood trim. It has a masthead sloop rig, a raked stem with a bowsprit, a rounded transom, with a boomkin, a keel-mounted rudder controlled by a tiller and a fixed long keel. It displaces  and carries  of lead ballast.

The design has sleeping accommodation for four people, with a double "V"-berth in the bow cabin, a straight settee in the main cabin and an aft cabin with a single berth on the starboard side. The galley is located on the starboard side amidships. The galley is equipped with a two-burner stove and a sink. A navigation station is beside the companionway steps, on the port side. The head is located just aft of the bow cabin on the port side and includes a stand-up shower.

Operational history
In a 2010 review Steve Henkel wrote, "not many of these beefy Taiwan-built imports were made, perhaps because they weren't heavily advertised. But we can picture taking off from Seattle to cruise the Inside Passage to Alaska, or even doing a partial circumnavigation in one of these. Best features: Full cruising amenities are unusual in a boat this size: boom gallows, stern anchor roller chock on the boomkin, long companionway dodger, stand-up shower, large water and fuel tanks, big chart table, good ventilation, lots of storage space. Owners say she is extremely seakindly, and tracks her course well. Her outboard rudder makes mounting a windvane (such as a Monitor) relatively convenient. Standard equipment is extensive and generally of high quality (e.g, two stainless steel water tanks, dorade vents, etc.). Worst features: Some of her through-hull fittings are difficult to access. Hull may be susceptible to some small-scale blistering. The 15 hp Yanmar is said to move the boat at only five knots, possibly indicating either insufficient horsepower or the wrong prop selection. The theoretical hull speed based on waterline length is 6.2 knots. The battenless mainsail, supposedly for easier reefing, doesn't make sense to us. We'd add 'em."

See also
List of sailing boat types

References

External links
Photo of a Vancouver 25

Keelboats
1980s sailboat type designs
Sailing yachts 
Trailer sailers
Sailboat type designs by Robert B. Harris
Sailboat types built by Vancouver 25 Yacht Company